Victoria Tower, Jersey, is a Martello tower that the British completed in 1837 and named after Queen Victoria, who succeeded to the Throne in that year. The tower sits on Le Mont Nicholas in Saint Martin, and its builders placed it there to impede an enemy from siting guns there with which to bombard Mont Orgueil. Currently, the National Trust for Jersey administers the tower.

Design
The tower is the only Martello on Jersey to have a ditch around it. A drawbridge spans the ditch. In the counterscarp beneath the drawbridge there is a small room, with two doors, that may have been a store room. Inside the tower a circular staircase connected the three floors. The tower was armed with a single 24-pounder gun. During World War II and the Occupation of the Channel Islands, the Germans placed a small anti-aircraft gun on the top of the tower.

Citations and references
Citations

References
Clements, William H. (1998) Towers of Strength: Story of Martello Towers. (London: Pen & Sword). .
Grimsley, E.J. (1988) The Historical Development of the Martello Tower in the Channel Islands. (Sarnian Publications). .
Sutcliffe, Sheila (1973) Martello Towers. (Cranbury, NJ: Associated Universities Press).

Buildings and structures in Saint Martin, Jersey
Coastal artillery
Fortifications in Jersey
History of Jersey
Jersey
Towers in Jersey
Towers completed in 1837
Martello towers